The 1955 Great Plains tornado outbreak was a deadly tornado outbreak that struck the southern and central U.S Great Plains States on May 25–26, 1955. It produced at least 47 tornadoes across seven states including two F5 tornadoes in Blackwell, Oklahoma, and Udall, Kansas that caused most of the casualties. The outbreak killed 102 people while injuring hundreds more. Unusual electromagnetic activity was observed, including St. Elmo's fire.

Meteorological synopsis

Confirmed tornadoes

 Sources: SPC Tornado data,

May 25 event

May 26 event

Blackwell, Oklahoma

The Blackwell tornado formed in Noble County at around 9:00pm CDT before crossing through the eastern portions of the Kay County town of Blackwell as an F5 wedge tornado. Along with destroying nearly 200 homes, the tornado also demolished the town's main employers including the Acme Foundry and the Hazel Atlas Glass plant. 400 homes were destroyed or swept away, and 500 other homes were damaged. 60 businesses were also destroyed and the local hospital also sustained major damage. Most of the western half of the town was spared the worst of the damage.

Udall, Kansas

About 30 minutes after producing the Blackwell tornado, the same supercell produced another violent and long-tracked tornado just east of the first tornado track near the Kansas/Oklahoma border. It proceeded northward across Sumner and Cowley Counties. The town of Udall was especially hard hit with F5 damage that included the disintegration of numerous structures and homes all across the town. Even the town's water tower was toppled. Half of the town's population was killed or injured. Numerous homes and businesses were destroyed, many of which were swept away. Vehicles were thrown hundreds of yards and mangled beyond recognition, including a pickup truck that was wrapped around a tree and stripped of everything but its frame and tires. The Udall public school building sustained major damage, with beams snapped and blown away. This tornado was the deadliest in the state's history with 80 fatalities and 273 injuries.

Other tornadoes 

In addition to the F5 tornadoes, NWS officials confirmed an additional F2 tornado near Tonkawa which may have been either part of the Blackwell tornado or a satellite tornado. Other tornadoes in the region occurred on May 27 near the same region but did little damage. Among them were those produced by a thunderstorm which traveled through the Oklahoma City, Oklahoma area, where it produced weak tornadoes with minimal damage in the towns of Norman and Chickasha.

Another deadly tornado occurred south of Woodward and at Cheyenne in Roger Mills County in southwestern Oklahoma, killing two people. This storm originated from the Texas Panhandle. The final tornado in the hardest-hit region occurred during the early morning hours of May 26 when a weak tornado occurred in Salisaw in Sequoyah County near the Arkansas border.

Numerous tornadoes occurred across the Midwestern states from Arkansas to Illinois. The strongest tornado was located near the Little Rock area but no fatalities were reported with this tornado or any other on May 26.

See also 

 List of North American tornadoes and tornado outbreaks
 List of F5 tornadoes
 Radio atmospheric

Notes

References

Bibliography 
 Thomas P. Grazulis (1993). Significant Tornadoes 1680–1991, A Chronology and Analysis of Events. The Tornado Project of Environmental Films.  (hardcover).

External links 
 Tornado Table from NWS Norman, Oklahoma 
 Outbreak Summary from NWS Norman, Oklahoma
 NWS Wichita, Kansas page on the Udall tornado
 Full map of 1955 Great Plains tornado outbreak Tornado History Project

F5 tornadoes
Tornadoes of 1955
Tornadoes in Kansas
Tornadoes in Oklahoma
Tornadoes in Texas
Tornadoes in Arkansas
Tornadoes in Illinois
Tornadoes in Missouri
1955 natural disasters in the United States
May 1955 events in the United States